2 Corinthians 7 is the seventh chapter of the Second Epistle to the Corinthians in the New Testament of the Christian Bible. It is authored by Paul the Apostle and Timothy (2 Corinthians 1:1) in Macedonia in 55–56 CE.

Text
The original text was written in Koine Greek. This chapter is divided into 16 verses.

Textual witnesses
Some early manuscripts containing the text of this chapter are:
Papyrus 46 (~AD 200)
Codex Vaticanus (325–350)
Codex Sinaiticus (330–360)
Papyrus 117 (4th century; extant verses 6–8,9-11)
Codex Alexandrinus (400–440)
Codex Ephraemi Rescriptus (~450)
Codex Freerianus (~450; extant verses 7–8,13–14)
Codex Claromontanus (~550)

Verse 1
The New King James Version and the New International Version and biblical commentators Johann Bengel and Heinrich Meyer treat verse 1 as the conclusion of verses 11–18 in the previous chapter: 
 Therefore, having these promises, beloved, let us cleanse ourselves from all filthiness of the flesh and spirit, perfecting holiness in the fear of God.
God promises to walk in His temple, dwell in His churches, be their God, and they His people, be their Father, and they His "beloved" sons and daughters.
Some copies read "brethren" for "beloved", including the Ethiopian version.

See also
Macedonia
Titus
Related Bible parts: John 14, John 15, John 17, Romans 8, Galatians 5

References

Sources

External links
 King James Bible - Wikisource
English Translation with Parallel Latin Vulgate
Online Bible at GospelHall.org (ESV, KJV, Darby, American Standard Version, Bible in Basic English)
Multiple bible versions at Bible Gateway (NKJV, NIV, NRSV etc.)

2 Corinthians 7